The Krivaja is a river in central-northern parts of Bosnia and Herzegovina, and a right tributary of the Bosna River. Its source is confluence of the Stupčanica and the Bioštica rivers at the western outskirts of town of Olovo. From there the Krivaja flows through the scenic gorge between mountains of Zvijezda and Konjuh (mountain), with lot of small mountain streams and small rivers inflow from both sides. Finally, the Krivaja meets the Bosna River at the vicinity of town of Zavidovići.

The river is well known for rafting, canoeing and freshwater fishing. The Krivaja basin is known for an abundant ichthyo-fauna, rich in species, some of which are critically endangered, such as hucho (also known as Danube Salmon or Danube Taimen) (Lat. Hucho hucho). All the Krivaja tributaries and especially its headwaters are important spawning grounds for both Danube Taimen and its prey, Common nase (Chondrostoma nasus) and Grayling (Thymallus thymallus).
The Kaljina, its parent the Bioštica, and the Stupčanica are main source of the Krivaja waters, and all three are unspoiled in sense of water quality, their hydromorphology, natural surrounding and river biodiversity. Rich pool of indigenous salmonids such as Danube brown trout (Salo truta fario, Danube lineage), spawning grounds for hucho and nase, can only be maintained through statutory protection, and preservation of the Krivaja basin streams and rivers uninterrupted flows from construction of dams. However, plans for hydropower development exist, and represent real risk for the unspoiled natural environment of the region.

References

Further reading

External links 
bistrobih.ba - rijeka Krivaja
outdooractive.com - Bosnia and Herzegovina - Krivaja canyon

 
Rivers of Bosnia and Herzegovina
Zavidovići
Olovo Municipality
Vareš Municipality
Rafting in Bosnia and Herzegovina
Recreational fishing in Bosnia and Herzegovina
Water sports in Bosnia and Herzegovina
Hucho habitats in Bosnia and Herzegovina